The  is a railway line of the Japanese private railway company Kintetsu Railway, connecting Kintetsu-Yokkaichi Station (Yokkaichi, Mie Prefecture) and Yunoyama-Onsen Station (Komono, Mie Prefecture) in Japan.

The line connects with the Nagoya Line and Yokkaichi Asunarou Railway Utsube Line at Kintetsu-Yokkaichi Station.

History

Yokkaichi Railway
The Yunoyama Line was originally conceived and built by ) in the 1910s. It was constructed with the purposes of providing access in the city of Yokkaichi and providing tourists access to the Yunoyama area. The line was completed in 1913 and in 1916 an extension from the line's origin,  (at that time called Suwa Station and located slightly to the east), to JR  was added. This made Suwa Station, a hub between three private railways and the biggest station in Yokkaichi, the origin again. Steam engines originally ran on the tracks; in the 1920s the line was electrified, following a trend of many railways in the area.

Ownership of the line has shifted. Yokkaichi Railway created the line. It was absorbed by Mie Railway (Santetsu) in 1931, who built and operated the nearby Utsube Line which also originated from Suwa Station at that time. Then in 1944, Santetsu, with six other companies, merged to form Mie Transport (Sanco). Twenty years later, the railway department of Sanco split off to become a separate company called Mie Electric Railway (Sanden). This organization was short-lived as it was bought up by railway giant Kinki Nippon Railway (Kintetsu) the following year, and thus in 1965 the line came under its current name and ownership.

Renovation
In 1954 the beginning of the route received a significant re-routing at the hands of Sanco, the owner. The Nagoya Line suffered from many sharp curves on its way through Yokkaichi to Suwa Station. Kintetsu developed a plan to straighten the line as well as enlarge Suwa Station, which would be moved about a kilometer to the west. Construction began in 1952 and took a few years to be completed.  In accordance with this plan, Sanco altered its own Yokkaichi-area railways in 1956 to use the new location of Suwa Station, which was renamed to Kintetsu-Yokkaichi Station. From Nakagawara Station, the track that ran to the old Suwa Station was closed and a new track was built to Kintetsu-Yokkaichi. After this new section was completed, the Yunoyama Line originated from the part of Kintetsu-Yokkaichi Station where the Utsube Line still originates today; the two lines had the same track gauge at that time and connected directly with each other.

About 10 years later, in 1964, when Sanden took over the railway, more improvements were carried out even though Sanden only owned the line for about one year.

This service was offered for over 30 years but was ceased in 1998 due to insufficient ridership. Limited express trains that originated at Kintetsu-Yokkaichi continued to run the length of the Yunoyama Line for a few more years, but this service was ended in 2004. The Yunoyama Line is notable because it is the only one of Kintetsu's many small branch lines to have offered limited express service.

Timeline
June 1, 1913 – Kawashimamura (now Ise-Kawashima) ~ Yunoyama (now Yunoyama-Onsen) section opened by Yokkaichi Railway.
September 24, 1913 – Suwa (now Kintetsu-Yokkaichi) ~ Kawashimamura section opens.
March 3, 1916 – Yokkaichi (Kokutetsu) ~ Suwa section opens.
November 1, 1921 – Entire line electrified.
November 29, 1927 – Yokkaichi – Suwa section closes. Suwa becomes the origin of the line.
March 1, 1931 – Yokkaichi Railway is absorbed by Mie Railway (Santetsu).
February 1, 1944 – Matsumotomura Station officially renamed Ise-Matsumoto Station.
February 11, 1944 – Santetsu and six other companies merge to form Mie Transport (Sanco). Connection with Utsube Line opens. Officially renamed Sanco Mie Line.
July 1, 1954 – Kawashimamura Station officially renamed Ise-Kawashima Station. Sakuramura Station officially renamed Sakura Station.
September 23, 1956 – Suwa Station closed, moved, and re-opened as Kintetsu-Yokkaichi Station. Suwa ~ Nakagawara section closes. Kintetsu-Yokkaichi ~ Nakagawara section opens.
February 1, 1964 – Sanco railway division splits off and forms a new company Mie Electric Railway (Sanden).
March 23, 1964 – Ōbane-en Station opens. Direct connection with Utsube Line closes. Direct connection with Nagoya Line opens.
April 1, 1965 – Sanden, and all of its lines, are acquired by Kinki Nippon Railway (Kintetsu). Line officially renamed Kintetsu Yunoyama Line.
July 15, 1965 – Direct limited express service from Osaka and Nagoya begins.
October 17, 1968 – ATS system activated on entire line.
August 1, 1970 – Yunoyama Station officially renamed to Yunoyama-Onsen Station.
March 11, 1973 – Elevated portion of the Kintetsu-Yokkaichi ~ Nakagawara section is completed and opens.
March 17, 1998 – Direct limited express service from Osaka and Nagoya ends.
March 18, 2004 – Limited express service along the line ends.

Service
 Local (普通 futsū)
 For 
 For 
Locals stop at every station.
All trains offer conductor-less (one man) service.
Trains run twice per hour during the day, three or four times per hour in the mornings and evenings.

Limited express service on the Yunoyama Line ended in 2004.

2008 limited express service
Direct limited express service to and from Nagoya will be temporarily resumed on weekends and holidays in late July and early August 2008 in commemoration of the 50th anniversary of the Gozaisho Ropeway as well as the 40th anniversary of Suzuka National Park. These trains will run once a day in each direction. Limited express trains on the Yunoyama Line will go from Kintetsu-Yokkaichi to Yunoyama-Onsen without stopping.

Stations

References
  Kintetsu Line Archives - Yunoyama Line
  Wikipedia - Kintetsu Yunoyama Line

Footnotes

External links
 Kintetsu railway network map - Yunoyama Line
  Main Terminal - Kintetsu Yunoyama Line

Yunoyama Line
Rail transport in Mie Prefecture
Standard gauge railways in Japan
Railway lines opened in 1913
2 ft 6 in gauge railways in Japan
1913 establishments in Japan